Dabari is a village in the Punjab province of Pakistan.

Villages in Gujranwala District